The Mitchell colonial by-election, 1867 was a by-election held on 4 January 1867 in the electoral district of Mitchell for the Queensland Legislative Assembly.

History
On 22 November 1866, Theodore Harden, the member for Mitchell, resigned. Edward Lamb won the resulting by-election on 4 January 1867.

See also
 Members of the Queensland Legislative Assembly, 1863–1867

References

1867 elections in Australia
Queensland state by-elections
1860s in Queensland